Saint Ragener (also Ragner) was, according to medieval documentary sources, a Christian martyr of the 9th century AD, who died at the hands of the Vikings alongside his uncle Edmund the Martyr. He was buried at St Peter's Church, Northampton.

References 

Year of death unknown
Year of birth unknown
Anglo-Saxon saints
9th-century deaths
Christianity in Northampton